A Thousand Mountains, A Million Streams is a composition for orchestra by the Chinese-American composer Lei Liang.  The work was commissioned by the Boston Modern Orchestra Project on a grant from the Jebediah Foundation New Music Commissions. It was first performed by the Boston Modern Orchestra Project under the direction of Gil Rose in Jordan Hall, Boston, on April 21, 2018.  It is dedicated to Robert Amory and in memory of Jung Ying Tsao.  The piece was later awarded the 2020, Grawemeyer Award for Music Composition.

Composition
The work was inspired by a landscape painting by the Chinese ink wash painter Huang Binhong, done when the artist was almost completely blind. In the score program notes, Liang wrote, "A Thousand Mountains, A Million Streams meditates on the loss of landscapes of cultural and spiritual dimensions. The work implies an intention to preserve and resurrect parallel landscapes - both spiritual and physical – and sustain a place where we and our children can belong."

Structure
A Thousand Mountains, A Million Streams has a duration of approximately 30 minutes and is cast in two parts divided into fifteen short movements played without pause:
Mountains in Darkness and the Piercing Light
Mountains Gradually Draw Closer
A Song Emerges
Flying Clouds
Admonition - The Breaking Down of Landscapes
Opening the Inner Eyes
Vibration and Pulsations
Ethereal Lights and Distant Mountains
Mountains Breathing
Mountains in Motion
Mountains Take Flight
The Shredding of Landscapes
Healing Rain Drops/Part I
Healing Rain Drops/Part II
Landscape's Heartbeat Returns

Instrumentation
The music is scored for a large orchestra comprising two flutes (1st doubling piccolo, 2nd doubling alto flute), two oboes, two clarinets (2nd doubling bass clarinet), two bassoons, two horns, two trumpets, trombone, bass trombone, tuba, three percussionists, harp, piano, and strings.

Reception
Reviewing the world premiere, the music critic Allan Kozinn of The Wall Street Journal praised the piece, remarking, "Cast in two large sections, reflecting the two parts of the title, the piece begins, much like Mr. Huang's work, as an abstract exercise in timbral morphing. But it quickly takes more concrete form, with the first, densely layered section evoking the imposing majesty of the mountains, and the second—scored mainly for tactile percussion—suggesting the fluidity of the streams."  Guy Rickards of Gramophone similarly wrote, "In A Thousand Mountains, a Million Streams [...] Liang's tonal and textural palettes become ever more exquisite, ranging from sonorities at the edge of silence in 'Healing Rain Drops' to full-orchestral might describing the shredding of landscapes. Liang's Chinese-inflected sound world is never less than fascinating and always deeply involving."

Recording
A recording of A Thousand Mountains, A Million Streams was released on album, along with Liang's Xiaoxiang and Five Seasons, under the Boston Modern Orchestra Project record label in November 2018.

References

Compositions by Lei Liang
2017 compositions
Compositions for symphony orchestra
Music commissioned by the Boston Modern Orchestra Project